Elections for the Pennsylvania State Senate will be held on , with 25 of 50 districts being contested. The term of office for those elected in 2024 will begin when the Senate convenes in January 2025. Pennsylvania State Senators are elected for four-year terms, with half of the seats up for election every two years.  The election will coincide with the 2024 U.S. presidential election, elections to the U.S. Senate, elections to the U.S. House of Representatives, and elections to the entirety of the Pennsylvania House of Representatives.

Republicans have controlled the chamber since the 1994 election ( years).

Retiring incumbents

Republicans

Primary elections

Democratic primary

Republican primary

General election

Overview

District breakdown

See also 

 2022 Pennsylvania elections
 Elections in Pennsylvania

References

External links 

 
 
 
  (State affiliate of the U.S. League of Women Voters)

Pennsylvania
Pennsylvania State Senate elections
Senate